Bent Hamer (born 18 December 1956) is a film director, writer and producer, born in Sandefjord, Norway in 1956.

Biography
Hamer studied film theory and literature at the University of Stockholm and the Stockholm Film School. In addition to his feature films, he has written and directed a number of short films and documentaries. His first film, Eggs, premiered at the 1995 Cannes Film Festival where it was shown in the Directors' Fortnight section. That same year, it was shown in competition at the 19th Moscow International Film Festival where it won the award for Best First Film; it also received the FIPRESCI Prize at the 1995 Toronto International Film Festival.  His 2003 film Kitchen Stories screened at many international festivals and was the Norwegian submission for the Academy Award for Best Foreign Language Film.

In April 2004, Bent Hamer started shooting Factotum based on the novel of the same name by US poet and writer Charles Bukowski. The screenplay was written by Hamer and Jim Stark (Mystery Train, Cold Fever), who produced the film together with Christine Walker (American Splendor). The film premiered at the Kosmorama Film Festival in Trondheim, Norway, on 2005-04-12.

Hamer is the owner and founder of the BulBul Film Association, established in Oslo in 1994.

Filmography

Feature films
 Eggs, 1995
 Water Easy Reach (En dag til i solen), 1998
 Kitchen Stories (Salmer fra kjøkkenet), 2003
 Factotum, 2005
 O' Horten, 2008
 Home for Christmas, 2010
 1001 Grams (2014)
 The Middle Man (2021)

Short films
 Rødvyn Aargang 81, 1981
 Longitude Latitude (Makrellen er kommen), 1989
 Happy Hour, 1990 (co-director: Jörgen Bergmark)
 Sunday Dinner (Søndagsmiddag), 1990
 Stone (Stein), 1992
 Applause (Applaus), 1993
 Just for the hell of it (Bare kødd), 1995

Documentaries
 Courage to Dignity (Mot til verdighet), 1994
 Norway the Conqueror (Norge erobreren), part of documentary series 2001–05

References

External links
 Norwegian Film Institute Webpage for O'Horten
 

1956 births
Living people
People from Sandefjord
Norwegian film directors
Norwegian screenwriters